James Saleam (born 18 September 1955) is an Australian far-right extremist and the chairman of the Australia First Party. Saleam has been described as a white nationalist, who has been a strong advocate of barring further immigration to preserve a "self-contained, predominantly white nation resistant to further immigration or watering-down of its culture".  This is often considered ironic  Saleam is alleged to have mixed Lebanese ancestry; indigenous people of the Middle East, and in fact all non-Europeans, and even some Southern Europeans were once barred from immigrating to Australia until the 1950s under the White Australia policy. He has been observed wearing a swastika armband and associating with neo-Nazi skinheads.

Early life 
Saleam, the son of Lebanese immigrants, was born on 18 September 1955 in Maryborough, Queensland.

Political activism
In 1970, at the age of 15, he joined the National Socialist Party of Australia. He was arrested and convicted for the fire-bombing of a Maoist bookshop in Brisbane in 1972.

In 1975, "much to his later chagrin", Saleam was photographed in full Nazi uniform at a public meeting. On Anzac Day 1982, he co-founded National Action (NA), which eventually collapsed due to Saleam's convictions for property offences and fraud in 1984, possession of a prohibited article - a large nail-studded club in 1985, and for organising a shotgun attack in 1989 on African National Congress Australian representative Eddie Funde, for which he served three years in prison. 

After his release from prison, Saleam was awarded a PhD in politics from the University of Sydney by writing a thesis entitled The Other Radicalism: An Inquiry into Contemporary Australian Extreme Right Ideology, Politics And Organization 1975–1995. 

Saleam was affiliated with the Patriotic Youth League, and has been seen associating with neo-Nazi skinheads.

In 2004, Saleam contested the NSW local government elections, and ran for Marrickville Council on an anti-refugee platform. In 2012, he ran for NSW local government election in the City of Blue Mountains.

Australia First Party
Saleam was the Secretary of the Sydney branch of the Australia First Party (AFP) between 2002 and 2007, when he became its chairman, and sought to re-establish the party. In July 2009, he announced that it had reached its target of 500 members and was registering the New South Wales branch party with the Australian Electoral Commission (AEC). The party was reregistered in mid-2010, in time to contest the 2010 federal election. 

AFP contested the 2013 federal election, Saleam standing in the seat of Cook on a platform to end refugee intakes, running against Scott Morrison.  He received 617 votes, or 0.67% of the vote.

On 14 July 2015, the AEC deregistered the AFP due to its failure to demonstrate the required number of members. It was reregistered on 1 March 2016 as "Australia First Party (NSW) Incorporated".

Saleam stood at the 2016 federal election in the seat of Lindsay and received 1068 votes or 1.2% of the vote. He stood for AFP in the 2018 Longman by-election, receiving 709 votes or 0.8% of the vote.

Saleam stood in the seat of Cootamundra, New South Wales, in the 2017 by-election as an independent, though still a member of Australia First, as the party is not registered for state elections. He received 453 votes, 1% of the total. He again stood in the seat at the 2019 New South Wales state election as an independent, receiving 0.95% of the vote. Saleam's platform included the reintroduction of the White Australia policy and opposition to Chinese immigration.

Personal life
Saleam married Jane Mengler in 1987. They had two children and divorced in 1994.

Electoral history
Federal Parliament elections

state Parliament elections

See also
 Australia First Party
 Far-right politics in Australia
 National Socialist Party of Australia
 Reclaim Australia
 True Blue Crew
 United Patriots Front

References

External links
 Australian Nationalist Ideological, Historical and Legal Archive maintained by James Saleam
 Historic photo's of Saleam and other members of the National Socialist Party of Australia News article featuring several historic photographs of Saleam wearing Nazi attire including a swastika arm band. 

1955 births
20th-century Australian criminals
Living people
Australia First Party politicians
Australian people of Lebanese descent
Australian anti-communists
Australian fraudsters
Australian neo-Nazis
Far-right politics in Australia
Politicians from Queensland
Anti-Asian sentiment in Australia
Anti-immigration politics in Australia
People convicted of fraud
Criminals from Sydney
University of Sydney alumni
Neo-fascist politicians
Alt-right activists